Vinyl resin may refer to:
 Polyvinyl chloride, a synthetic plastic polymer
 Vinyl ester resin, also known as just "vinyl ester"